Andrew John Train (born 21 September 1963) is a British sprint canoeist and marathon canoeist who competed from the mid-1980s to the early 2000s (decade). He won seven medals at the ICF Canoe Sprint World Championships with two silvers (C-2 10000 m: 1985, 1995), and five bronzes (C-2 1000 m: 1997, C-1 10000 m: 1991, C-2 10000 m: 1987, 1989, 1991).

Between 1984 and 2000, Train competed in five Summer Olympics, earning his best finish of sixth twice (C-1 1000 m: 1992, C-2 1000 m: 1996).

Train has also won three ICF Canoe Marathon World Championships, in 1988, 1996 and 1998, competing in C-2 with his brother Stephen Train.

References

External links
 
 

1963 births
Living people
British male canoeists
ICF Canoe Sprint World Championships medalists in Canadian
Medalists at the ICF Canoe Marathon World Championships
Olympic canoeists of Great Britain
Canoeists at the 1984 Summer Olympics
Canoeists at the 1988 Summer Olympics
Canoeists at the 1992 Summer Olympics
Canoeists at the 1996 Summer Olympics
Canoeists at the 2000 Summer Olympics